Osceola is a village in Polk County, Wisconsin, United States. The population was 2,765 at the 2020 census. Located mostly within the Town of Osceola, the village sits on the border with Minnesota, separated by the St. Croix River. It is along Wisconsin Highway 35.

The Village Board has articulated the 10 most significant assets and given them the name "the Power of 10".  They are:  1) Schools; 2) Airport (the Osceola Municipal Airfield); 3) Industrial Park; 4) the St. Croix River; 5) the Cascade Falls; 6) Downtown Businesses; 7) Personalization/Historic Feel of Downtown; 8) access to a major population center (Minneapolis/St. Paul Metropolitan Region); 9) Medical Services; Tie for 10/11) Recreational opportunities and the Braves.

History
The village was named after Osceola, chief of the Seminoles.

Geography
Osceola is located at  (45.322365, -92.698534). Cascade Falls, a  waterfall with a  crest on Osceola Creek, is located in downtown Osceola.

Demographics

2020 census
As of the census of 2020, there were 2,765 people, and 1,224 households living in the village. There were 1,356 housing units. The racial makeup of the village was 94.1% White, 0.7% African American, 0.5% Native American, 0.65% Asian, 1% from other races, and 3% from two or more races. Hispanic or Latino of any race were 7.05% of the population when subtracting those saying they were not in this category.  Only 0.2% stated this explicitly.  Median Gross rents were $875.  53.2% of the residents were homeowners.

There were 1,224 households, of which 24.6% had children under the age of 18 living with them.  6.4% of households had children were under the age of 5, 14% in the 5 to 14 year range and 4.2% had children ages 15 to 17. 41.5% were married couples family households, 35% had a female householder with no husband present, 13.2% had a male householder with no wife present, and 42.2% were non-families. 45.6% were married (except separated), 9% were widowed, 18.1% were divorced, and 0.4% were separated.  26.9% had never married.  17.3% of the population was 65 years or older. 6.2% were veterans.

The median age in the village was 37.1 years.  The average household income was $50,938 and 13.8% of the population was in poverty. 19.4% of the village residents have attained a Bachelor's Degree or higher.  Manufacturing was the top industry and employed 31.6% of the labor force. This was followed by education at 19.8%, retail trade at 10.4% and arts/entertainment/recreation at 8.4%.

2010 census
As of the census of 2010, there were 2,568 people, 1,142 households, and 660 families living in the village. The racial makeup of the village was 96.0% White, 0.3% African American, 0.3% Native American, 1.0% Asian, 0.9% from other races, and 1.6% from two or more races. Hispanic or Latino of any race were 2.1% of the population.

There were 1,142 households, of which 32.7% had children under the age of 18 living with them, 38.6% were married couples living together, 13.2% had a female householder with no husband present, 6.0% had a male householder with no wife present, and 42.2% were non-families. 36.0% of all households were made up of individuals, and 11.5% had someone living alone who was 65 years of age or older. The average household size was 2.25 and the average family size was 2.91.

The median age in the village was 36.4 years. 26.1% of residents were under the age of 18; 7.1% were between the ages of 18 and 24; 27.4% were from 25 to 44; 26.6% were from 45 to 64; and 12.8% were 65 years of age or older. The gender makeup of the village was 47.3% male and 52.7% female.

2000 census
As of the census of 2000, there were 2,421 people, 1,002 households, and 615 families living in the village. The population density was 656.9 people per square mile (253.3/km2). There were 1,072 housing units at an average density of 290.9 per square mile (112.2/km2). The racial makeup of the village was 97.44% White, 0.37% Black or African American, 0.33% Native American, 0.21% Asian, 0.37% from other races, and 1.28% from two or more races. 0.91% of the population were Hispanic or Latino of any race.

There were 1,002 households, out of which 35.5% had children under the age of 18 living with them, 44.9% were married couples living together, 12.0% had a female householder with no husband present, and 38.6% were non-families. 31.3% of all households were made up of individuals, and 10.8% had someone living alone who was 65 years of age or older. The average household size was 2.38 and the average family size was 3.01.

In the village, the population was spread out, with 27.9% under the age of 18, 9.8% from 18 to 24, 32.9% from 25 to 44, 16.7% from 45 to 64, and 12.7% who were 65 years of age or older. The median age was 33 years. For every 100 females, there were 92.4 males. For every 100 females age 18 and over, there were 88.2 males.

The median income for a household in the village was $39,000, and the median income for a family was $45,846. Males had a median income of $33,017 versus $22,453 for females. The per capita income for the village was $18,921. About 4.3% of families and 6.1% of the population were below the poverty line, including 7.2% of those under age 18 and 6.0% of those age 65 or over.

Education
Osceola is served by the Osceola School District. Osceola High School has grades 9-12.

Transportation
L.O. Simenstad Municipal Airport (KOEO), serves the village and surrounding communities. In 2006, a glider club was based there.  Osceola Aerosport provides aviation training.

The Soo Line Depot offers train rides on the Osceola and St. Croix Valley Railway.

Museum
The Osceola and St Croix Valley Railway Museum is in Osceola, operating out of the historic 1916 Soo Line Depot. The railway moved to Osceola in 1992.

Notable people
Henry Peleg Burdick, Wisconsin State Representative
Dougald D. Kennedy, Wisconsin State Representative
David E. Paulson, Wisconsin State Representative
Horst Rechelbacher, founder of the Aveda Corporation
Gustav Stickley, architect and furniture designer
Elmer Swenson, viticulturalist

References

External links
 Osceola, Wisconsin village website
 Sanborn fire insurance map: 1911

Villages in Polk County, Wisconsin
Villages in Wisconsin